This is a list of Iranian football transfers for the 2017–18 winter transfer window. Transfers of Iran Pro League are listed. Transfer window will open on December 19, 2017 and will be open until January 16, 2018.

Iran Pro League

Esteghlal 
Head coach:  Winfried Schäfer

In:

Out:

Esteghlal Khuzestan 
Head coach:  Abdollah Veisi

In:

Out:

Foolad 
Head coach:  Sirous Pourmousavi

In:

Out:

Gostaresh Foulad 
Head coach:  Firouz Karimi

In:

Out:

Naft Tehran 
Head coach:  Hamid Derakhshan

In:

Out:

Padideh 
Head coach:  Mohammad Reza Mohajeri

In:

Out:

Pars Jonoubi Jam 
Head coach:  Mehdi Tartar

In:

Out:

Paykan 
Head coach:  Majid Jalali

In:

Out:

Persepolis 
Head coach:  Branko Ivanković

In:

Out:

Saipa 
Head coach:  Ali Daei

In:

Out:

Sanat Naft 
Head coach:  Faraz Kamalvand

In:

Out:

Sepahan 
Head coach:  Zlatko Kranjčar

In:

Out:

Sepidrood 
Head coach:  Ali Nazarmohammadi

In:

Out:

Siah Jamegan 
Head coach:  Alireza Marzban

In:

Out:

Tractor Sazi 
Head coach:  Yahya Golmohammadi 

In:

Out:

Zob Ahan 
Head coach:  Amir Ghalenoei 

In:

Out:

Notes
PL Pro League quota.

See also
 List of Iranian football transfers summer 2016
 List of Iranian football transfers winter 2016–17
 List of Iranian football transfers summer 2017

Notes and references

Football transfers winter 2017–18
2017
Transfers